Macide Tanır (1 January 1922 – 6 February 2013) was a Turkish actress.

In 1943, she joined the Turkish State Theatres and continued her career on stage until 1985. In 1991, she was named a State Artist. Aside from her career on stage and cinema, she was also known for her roles as a voice actress.

Life and career 
Tanır was born in 1922. His father, İbrahim Birmeç, was a veterinary officer who migrated from Ioannina to Istanbul. She was raised in Pendik. After finishing her studies at Erenköy Girls High School she enrolled in the Ankara State Conservatory with her father's support. She started her education in the singing department. A year later, she switched to the theater department. She joined the State Theatres in 1943 after earning her master's degree. She first went on stage with a role in an adaptation of Molière's Le Bourgeois gentilhomme. She appeared on stage in more than sixty works. She left the State Theatres in 1985 and worked for Tiyatrokare for two years.

After ending her stage career, she was cast in the movies Yer Demir Gök Bakır, Yengeç Sepeti, and Cumhuriyet as well as the TV series Baharın Bittiği Yer and Şehnaz Tango. She also became known for her roles in radio theatre adaptations and worked as a voice actress on the Turkish version of a couple of movies.
 
In 1991, she was named a State Artist and later published her memoire Tiyatronun Cadısı in 2000. She died of respiratory failure in the intensive care unit on 6 February 2013. Tanır's body was buried in Emirgan Cemetery.

Awards 

 1961-62 Press poll among theater artists - Artist of the Year (Trees Die while Standing)
 1964-65 Press-Workers Union - Artist of the Year (Order of the World)
 1968-69 Art Lovers' Association - Best Actress (Hair Share)
 1973-74 Art Lovers' Association - Best Actress (Mistake)
 Art Foundation - Best Actress (Shadow Master)
 1988 Ministry of Culture - Special Jury Prize
 1988 City Theaters - Artist of the Year
 1988 Hürriyet Newspaper - Artist of the Year
 1989 Women's Union - Most Successful Artist
 1990 Mersin Culture and Art Festival - Honorary Award
 1990 Art Institution - Artist of the Year
 1991 State Artist
 1992-93 Avni Dilligil Honor Award - Guests of the House Without Music
 1992-93 Italian Ministry of Culture - Adelaide Ristari Prize
 1993 Ses-Der Award
 1993-94 Istanbul International Lions Club Award
 1996 Half Century On Stage - Golden Needle
 1996 Lions Board of Directors Award
 1996-97 ÇASOD Award
 1997 1st Afife Theater Awards - Nisa Serezli Aşkıner Special Award
 1998 Women's Union Şişli Branch 75th Anniversary of the Republic Award
 1998 Mimoza Magazine - Awards to 75 Women in 75 Years

Theatre 
Some works are included not under their original title, but rather under the title used for their adaptation.
 Lost in Yonkers : Neil Simon - Tiyatrokare - 1992
 Öyle Bir Sevgi Ki : Loleh Bellon - Ankara State Theatre - 1985
 On Golden Pond : Ernest Thompson - Ankara State Theatre - 1983
 Gölge Ustası : Yıldırım Türker\Yeşim Müderrisoğlu - Ankara State Theatre - 1982
 Lady Windermere's Fan : Oscar Wilde - Ankara State Theatre - 1977
 Dirlik Düzenlik : Oktay Rifat - Ankara State Theatre - 1974
 The Misunderstanding : Albert Camus - Ankara State Theatre - 1973
 Becket : Jean Anouilh - Ankara State Theatre - 1971
 Blood Wedding : Federico Garcia Lorca - Ankara State Theatre - 1970
 Finten : Abdülhak Hamit Tarhan - Ankara State Theatre - 1969
 Kıl Payı : Edward Albee - Ankara State Theatre - 1968
 Ecinliler : Fyodor Dostoyevski\Albert Camus - Ankara State Theatre - 1966
 Dünyanın Düzeni : Seán O'Casey - Ankara State Theatre - 1964
 Düşman Çiçek Göndermez : Pero Bloch - Ankara State Theatre - 1963
 Los árboles mueren de pie : Alejandro Casona - Ankara State Theatre - 1961
 Ghosts : Henrik Ibsen - Ankara State Theatre - 1960
 Cephede Piknik : Fernando Arrabal - Ankara State Theatre - 1960
 Günden Geceye : Eugene O'Neill - Ankara State Theatre - 1959
 Gönül Avcısı : Diego Fabbri - Ankara State Theatre - 1958
 Kraliçe ve Asilleri : Albert Hackett\Frances Goodrich - Ankara State Theatre - 1957
 Ruhlar Gelirse : Noël Coward - Ankara State Theatre - 1955
 Nora : Henrik Ibsen - Ankara State Theatre - 1955
 Akif Bey : Namık Kemal\Reşat Nuri Güntekin - Ankara State Theatre - 1955
 Tanrılar ve İnsanlar (Gilgamesh) : Orhan Asena - Ankara State Theatre - 1954
 Othello : William Shakespeare - Ankara State Theatre - 1954
 Keçiler Adası : Ugo Betti - Ankara State Theatre - 1954
 Hile ve Sevgi : Schiller - Ankara State Theatre - 1954
 Güneşte On Kişi : Turgut Özakman - Ankara State Theatre - 1954
 Batak : Galip Güral - Ankara State Theatre - 1953
 Yanlış Yanlış Üstüne : Oliver Goldsmith - Ankara State Theatre - 1952
 Sahne Dışındaki Oyun : Refik Ahmet Sevengi - Ankara State Theatre - 1952
 Fatih : Nazım Kurşunlu - Ankara State Theatre - 1952
 Ramak Kaldı : Thornton Wilder - Ankara State Theatre - 1952
 Gölgeler : Ahmet Muhip Dranas - Ankara State Theatre - 1952
 Elektra : Sophocles - Ankara State Theatre - 1952
 Bir Piyes Yazalım : Adalet Ağaoğlu - Ankara State Theatre - 1952
 Öteye Doğru : Sutton Vane - Ankara State Theatre - 1951
 Legacy : Augustus Goetz - Ankara State Theatre - 1951
 Köşebaşı : Ahmet Kutsi Tecer - Ankara State Theatre - 1951
 Alınyazısı : Nahid Sırrı Örik - Ankara State Theatre - 1951
 Şakacı : Sabahattin Kudret Aksal - Ankara State Theatre - 1951
 Pembe Evin Kaderi : Turgut Özakman - Ankara State Theatre - 1950
 The Old Tune : Reşat Nuri Güntekin - Ankara State Theatre - 1950
 Peer Gynt : Henrik Ibsen - Ankara State Theatre - 1949
 Küçük Şehir : Cevat Fehmi Başkut - Ankara State Theatre - 1949
 Kıskançlar : Oktay Rıfat\Melih Cevdet Anday - Ankara State Theatre - 1949
 Hekimliğin Zaferi : Jules Romains - Ankara State Theatre - 1949
 Mercator : Plautus - Ankara State Theatre - 1949
 Dünya Gözüyle : Charles Vildrac - Ankara State Theatre - 1949
 Scapin the Schemer : Molière - Ankara State Theatre - 1949
 Antigone : Sophocles - Ankara State Theatre- 1949

Filmography 

 1987 Yer Demir Gök Bakır
 1989 Baharın Bittiği Yer
 1994 Cadı Ağacı
 1994 Yengeç Sepeti
 1996 Şehnaz Tango (TV series)
 1996 Kurtuluş
 1998 Cumhuriyet

Voice acting 
 Goodbye Again - as Paula Tessier (portrayed by Ingrid Bergman)
 Gilda - as Gilda Mundson Farrell (portrayed by Rita Hayworth)
 Titanic 
 Murder, She Wrote (TV series)

Radio theatre 
 1966: Brahms'ı Sever misiniz? (from the series Arkası Yarın, an adaptation of a novel by Françoise Sagan)

Books 
 "Tiyatronun Cadısı", Macide Tanır, Bilgi Yayınevi (autobiography/memoire), Ankara, 2000.

References

External links 
 
 Interview with Macide Tanır, TRT, 1991

1922 births
2013 deaths
Turkish film actresses
Turkish stage actresses
Erenköy Girls High School alumni
State Artists of Turkey